Araban (also Romanized as ‘Arabān; also known as ‘Oryān) is a village in Koregah-e Gharbi Rural District in the Central District of Khorramabad County, Lorestan Province, Iran. At the 2006 census, its population was 407, comprising 75 families.

References 

Towns and villages in Khorramabad County